Athous austriacus is a species of brown-coloured click beetle from the family Elateridae.

References

Beetles described in 1873
Endemic fauna of Austria
Dendrometrinae